Deliverance is a ghost town in Mt Ayr Township, Osborne County, Kansas, United States.

History
Initially named Pleasant Plain was first located near the head of Little Medicine Creek. Pleasant Plain was issued a post office in 1878. The post office name was changed to Deliverance in 1894, then discontinued in 1904. The population in 1910 was 20.

References

Former populated places in Osborne County, Kansas
Former populated places in Kansas